The 1981 Mauritanian coup d'état attempt was a violent coup attempt in Mauritania which took place on 16 March 1981. The coup attempt, staged by elements of the military and opposition Alliance for a Democratic Mauritania (AMD) movement, was led by Lieutenant Colonel Ahmed Salim Ould Sidi and Lieutenant Colonel Mohamed Abdelkader, and resulted in heavy fighting in the capital Nouakchott, before conspirators were defeated by troops loyal to the Head of State (CMSN chairman), Colonel Mohamed Khouna Ould Haidalla.

Abdelkader (former Air Force commander) was killed in the fighting, while Sidi (former CMSN vice chairman) was subsequently executed. On 25 April, Haidalla and the CMSN decided to replace the fledgling civilian government of Sid Ahmed Ould Bneijara (appointed on 12 December 1980) with a six-member military government headed by Colonel Maaouya Ould Sid'Ahmed Taya.

References 

Military coups in Mauritania
1980s coups d'état and coup attempts
History of Mauritania
Coup attempt
Conflicts in 1981
March 1981 events in Africa
Attempted coups d'état in Mauritania